At the 1972 Summer Olympics, fourteen different artistic gymnastics events were contested, eight for men and six for women.  All events were held at the Sports Hall in Munich from 27 August through 1 September.

Format of competition
The gymnastics competition at the 1972 Summer Olympics was carried out in three stages:

Competition I - The team competition/qualification round in which all gymnasts, including those who were not part of a team, performed both compulsory and optional exercises.  The combined scores of all team members determined the final score of the team.  The thirty-six highest scoring gymnasts in the all-around qualified to the individual all-around competition.  The six highest scoring gymnasts on each apparatus qualified to the final for that apparatus.
Competition II - The individual all-around competition, in which those who qualified from Competition I performed exercises on each apparatus.  The final score of each gymnast was composed of half the points earned by that gymnast during Competition I and all of the points earned by him or her in Competition II.
Competition III - The apparatus finals, in which those who qualified during Competition I performed an exercise on the individual apparatus on which he or she had qualified.  The final score of each gymnast was composed of half the points earned by that gymnast on that particular apparatus during Competition I and all of the points earned by him or her on that particular apparatus in Competition III.

No limits were imposed as to how many gymnasts each country could enter into the individual all-around final or apparatus finals.

Medal summary

Men's events

Women's events

Medal table

See also

List of Olympic medalists in gymnastics (men)
List of Olympic medalists in gymnastics (women)

References

External links

Official Olympic Report
www.gymnasticsresults.com
www.gymn-forum.net

 
1972 Summer Olympics events
1972
1972 in gymnastics